Cantlie is a surname. Notable people with the surname include:

 James Cantlie (1851–1926), Scottish physician
 John Cantlie (born 1970), British war photographer and correspondent